Uganda National Pipeline Company (UNPC), whose official name is National Pipeline Company Uganda Limited (NPCUL), is a Ugandan private limited liability company that is a 100 percent subsidiary of the Uganda National Oil Company (UNOC). UNPC was incorporated under the Companies Act of 2012, with the main objective being to hold the Uganda Government's interest in the crude oil, petroleum products and natural gas pipelines together with storage facilities and associated infrastructure, within the country's nascent petroleum industry.

Location
The headquarters of UNOC are located at the 4th Floor, Amber House, 29-33 Kampala Road in Kampala, Uganda's capital and largest city. The coordinates of UNOC headquarters are: 0°18'48.0"N, 32°34'55.0"E (Latitude:0.313333; Longitude:32.581944).

See also
Ministry of Energy and Mineral Development (Uganda)
Uganda Refinery Holding Company
Uganda Oil Refinery
Uganda-Tanzania Crude Oil Pipeline

References

External links
Petroleum value chain to get standards
New pipeline to enable Uganda to export oil by 2020

National oil and gas companies
Non-renewable resource companies established in 2014
Economy of Uganda
2015 establishments in Uganda
Oil and gas companies of Uganda
Government-owned companies of Uganda
Energy companies established in 2015
Oil companies of Uganda